(former name; Takeo Kimura, 木村 武夫) is a former Japanese football player and manager. He played for Japan national team.

Club career
Takahashi was born in Shinagawa, Tokyo on May 13, 1947. After graduating from high school, he joined Furukawa Electric in 1966. In 1967 season, he scored 15 goals and became a top scorer. He was 20 years old, this is the youngest top scorer in Japan Soccer League. He left the club in 1973 and entered Tokyo University of Agriculture. After graduating from Tokyo University of Agriculture, he joined Division 2 club Toshiba in 1979. In 1979, the club won the champions in Division 2. He retired in 1982.

National team career
In December 1966, Takahashi was selected Japan national team for 1966 Asian Games. At this competition, on December 17, he debuted against Thailand. He also played at 1970 Asian Games. This competition was his last game for Japan. He played 14 games and scored 4 goals for Japan until 1970.

Coaching career
After retirement, Takahashi became a manager for Toshiba (later Consadole Sapporo) in 1987. In 1989, he led the club to won the champions in Division 2 and promoted to Division 1. He managed the club until 1996.

Club statistics

National team statistics

Personal honors
Japan Soccer League Top Scorer: 1967
Japan Soccer League Best Eleven: 1967
Japan Soccer League Fighting Spirit Award: 1967

References

External links
 
 Japan National Football Team Database

1947 births
Living people
Tokyo University of Agriculture alumni
Association football people from Tokyo
Japanese footballers
Japan international footballers
Japan Soccer League players
JEF United Chiba players
Hokkaido Consadole Sapporo players
Japanese football managers
Hokkaido Consadole Sapporo managers
Asian Games medalists in football
Asian Games bronze medalists for Japan
Footballers at the 1966 Asian Games
Footballers at the 1970 Asian Games
Association football forwards
Medalists at the 1966 Asian Games
Mukoyōshi